The Philippine House Committee on Public Order and Safety, or House Public Order and Safety Committee is a standing committee of the Philippine House of Representatives.

Jurisdiction 
As prescribed by House Rules, the committee's jurisdiction is on the suppression of criminality which includes the following:
 Bureau of Fire Protection
 Bureau of Jail Management and Penology
 Philippine National Police and private security agencies
 Civil defense
 Firecrackers and pyrotechnics
 Illegal gambling
 Organized crime and illegal drugs
 Private armies
 Regulation of firearms
 Terrorism

Members, 18th Congress

See also 
 House of Representatives of the Philippines
 List of Philippine House of Representatives committees

References

External links 
House of Representatives of the Philippines

Public Order
Law enforcement in the Philippines